The Richmond Rovers Rugby League Club is a rugby league club based in Grey Lynn, New Zealand. The premier team is called the Richmond Bulldogs and compete in Auckland Rugby League's Fox Memorial competition.

Early history
 The club was formed in 1913 by employees at Mr. B. W. Davis' Boot Factory and Elliott's, following a scratch game in 1912. The club was originally affiliated with the Eden Ramblers club.

In 1883 the land surrounding Grey Lynn Park was subdivided and the houses were built. The area that is now Grey Lynn Park was too steep to build houses on and so, in 1914, the area was drained and flattened so sport could be played. Flood lights were installed at the park in the 1950s.

Richmond enjoyed considerable success in the middle decades of the 1900s. They were the first club to win the Fox Memorial, Roope Rooster, and Stormont Shield in 1934. They went on to win these trophies several more times in the following years. They also defeated 4 Australian club teams from 1934 to 1939 (including the Sydney champions - Western Suburbs 18–16, and 10–3 in 1934). This saw them win the Rangatira Shield, played for between Sydney and Auckland clubs. They won the Fox Memorial in 1934, 1935, 1937, 1940, 1946, 1949 , 1951, 1955 and 1956.

Bartercard Cup
The Richmond club were involved in the Bartercard Cup as a joint venture with the Marist Saints between 2000 and 2005. This team was called the Marist Richmond Brothers.

Notable players

48 Richmond Juniors have played for the New Zealand national rugby league team including Nigel Vagana, Fred Ah Kuoi, Steve Matai, David Solomona and Evarn Tuimavave. In addition 19 women have represented the New Zealand Women's team.

Other Warriors such as Tevita Latu, Steve Matai, Sam Lousi, Sione Lousi, John Palavi, Wayne McDade, Daniel Vasau, Evarn Tuimavave, Faavae Kalolo,  & Malo Solomona were also Richmond juniors.

American actor Geno Segers had a stint with the club.

A team of the century was named in 2013, and consisted of: 1. Bert Cooke, 2. Nigel Vagana, 3. Tom Baxter, 4. Maurie Robertson, 5. Vern Bakalich, 6. Fred Ah Kuoi, 7. Shane Varley, 8. Joe Vagana, 9. John Lasher, 10. Cliff Johnson (c), 11. Jim Riddell, 12. Se'e Solomona and 13. Raymond Williams.

Richmond Senior Team Records (1915-1944 + 2022)
The season record for the most senior men's team in the club.

Club Titles

Richmond Rovers grade championships (1910-1942)
 1921 Sixth Grade
 1922 Fourth Grade
 1923 Fifth Grade
 1925 Second Grade, Fourth Grade, Sixth Grade A, & Sixth Grade B
 1926 Third Grade Intermediate, & Fifth Grade
 1927 Third Grade Intermediate and Third Grade knockout competition, Fourth Grade (Hospital Cup), & Sixth Grade B (Myers Cup)
 1928 Third Grade Open, Third Grade Intermediate, & Fourth Grade
 1929 Third Grade Open, Fifth Grade, Sixth Grade A, & Sixth Grade B
 1930 Second Grade, Fourth Grade, Sixth Grade B, & Schoolboys (senior)
 1931 Third Grade Intermediate, & Seventh Grade
 1932 Reserve Grade, & Sixth Grade
 1933 Reserve Grade, Fifth Grade, & Seventh Grade
 1934 First Grade (Fox Memorial), Reserve Grade, Third Grade Open, & Seventh Grade
 1935 First Grade (Fox Memorial), Second Grade, Fifth Grade, Sixth Grade A, Seventh Grade, & Schoolboys (Senior)
 1936 Sixth Grade A, & Schoolboys (Senior)
 1937 First Grade (Fox Memorial), Reserve Grade, Fourth Grade, Schoolboys (Senior)
 1938 Reserve Grade, Third Grade Open, Seventh Grade, Schoolboy (Senior), Schoolboy (Intermediate)
 1939 Reserve Grade, Sixth Grade A, Seventh Grade
 1940 First Grade (Fox Memorial), Reserve Grade, Fifth Grade, Seventh Grade, Schoolboys (Senior)
 1941 Sixth Grade

Other titles
 1926 Roope Rooster
 1927 Roope Rooster
 1933 Roope Rooster
 1934 Roope Rooster, & Stormont Shield
 1935 Stormont Shield
 1936 Stormont Shield
 1938 Roope Rooster, & Stormont Shield
 1940 Roope Rooster
 1942 Roope Rooster

All time top point scorers (1922-1943)
The point scoring lists are compiled from matches played in matches from the first grade championship, the Roope Rooster, Phelan Shield, and Sharman Cup only. One off matches and exhibition matches are not included.

See also 
 Auckland Rugby League club trophies
 Fox Memorial Grand Finals

References

External links
Official Site
Auckland Rugby League

Richmond Bulldogs players
Rugby clubs established in 1913
1913 establishments in New Zealand